The 2015 Ukrainian Cup Final is a football match that will be played on 4 June 2015 in Kyiv. The match is the 24th Ukrainian Cup Final and is contested by Cup holders Dynamo Kyiv and Shakhtar Donetsk, making it part of the National Classic football game.

Road to Kyiv 

All 14 Ukrainian Premier League clubs do not have to go qualify to enter the competition; Dynamo and Shakhtar therefore both qualified automatically.

Previous encounters 

This will be the eighth Ukrainian Cup Final between the two teams and repeat of last years Cup Final. Dynamo has defeated Shakhtar five times out of the seven Cup Finals.

Dynamo had appeared in 13 Cup Finals winning 10 trophies and opponents Shakhtar had appeared in 14 Cup Finals winning 9.

Match

Details

See also
 2014–15 Ukrainian Premier League

References

Cup Final
Ukrainian Cup finals
Ukrainian Cup Final 2015
Ukrainian Cup Final 2015
Ukrainian Cup Final 2015
Ukrainian Cup Final 2015
June 2015 sports events in Ukraine